Liam McBean (born 25 August 1994) is a former professional Australian rules footballer who played for the Richmond Football Club in the Australian Football League (AFL). He was drafted by the Richmond Football Club with pick 33 in the 2012 National Draft from the Calder Cannons in the TAC Cup. He attended St. Bernard's College in the Melbourne suburb of Essendon. He attended the school alongside close friend and fellow 2012 draftee Joe Daniher. 

After playing for Richmond's Victorian Football League (VFL) team for the entirety of the 2013 and 2014 seasons, he made his AFL debut in round seven of the 2015 AFL season against the Collingwood Football Club.

While senior listed at Richmond in 2015, McBean was awarded the Jim 'Frosty' Miller Medal as the VFL Leading Goal Kicker in matches played for the club's reserve side. He kicked 42 goals for the season and tied with two others for the award.

At the conclusion of the 2016 season, he was delisted by Richmond.

In 2017, McBean played for Glenelg in the SANFL. He stepped away from the club in 2018 to travel overseas. He returned to Glenelg for the 2019 season and started with a bang against the Adelaide reserves. He played against Adelaide listed player Darcy Fogarty and kicked a game high 9 goals.

AFL statistics

|- style="background-color: #EAEAEA"
! scope="row" style="text-align:center" | 2013
|
| 34 || 0 || — || — || — || — || — || — || — || — || — || — || — || — || — || —
|-
|-
! scope="row" style="text-align:center" | 2014
|
| 34 || 0 || — || — || — || — || — || — || — || — || — || — || — || — || — || —
|-
|- style="background-color: #EAEAEA"
! scope="row" style="text-align:center" | 2015
|
| 34 || 2 || 0 || 1 || 9 || 7 || 16 || 5 || 2 || 0.0 || 0.5 || 4.5 || 3.5 || 8.0 || 2.5 || 1.0
|-
! scope="row" style="text-align:center" | 2016
|
| 34 || 3 || 1 || 3 || 15 || 10 || 25 || 12 || 6 || 0.3 || 1.0 || 5.0 || 3.3 || 8.3 || 4.0 || 2.0
|-
|- class="sortbottom"
! colspan=3| Career
! 5
! 1
! 4
! 24
! 17
! 41
! 17
! 8
! 0.2
! 0.8
! 4.8
! 3.4
! 8.2
! 3.4
! 1.6
|}

References

External links

Living people
1994 births
Calder Cannons players
Glenelg Football Club players
Australian rules footballers from Victoria (Australia)
Richmond Football Club players